Karanam Pavan Prasad (Kannada ) is an Indian author, artist and playwright in Kannada language. He gained notability with his first novel Karma (ಕರ್ಮ). His second novel was Nunni.

Early life
Prasad was born in the Bangalore district in Karnataka. He graduated with a Bachelor of Science degree from Bangalore University.

Career
His theatrical productions led him to Kannada literature.   His second play Purahara was well-received by theatre enthusiasts, he acted in the role of Arab Adil Shaw.  In 2013 he took a break from theatre to focus on Karma. He received guidance from novelist S. L. Bhyrappa. Karma was translated into English.

He started his career as a theatre director and playwright. He is working as a User Interface Designer, simultaneously engaging himself in research, literature study and writing.

His second novel Nunni  was released on 25 September 2015. It made a critical analysis of Christian missionaries. Nun is the protagonist. Prasad was than listed as a prominent Kannada writer. His 'Mother Elisa' character resembles Mother Teresa, It raised significant debates about truth, harmony, and service. His novel Grastha considered science and philosophy based on Indian aesthetics. Recently he has written a novel in the dark humor genre called Rayakonda. He is a best-selling novelist.

Plays 
Beedi Bimba Rangada Tumba (ಬೀದಿ ಬಿಂಬ ರಂಗದ ತುಂಬ) 2011
Purahara (ಪುರಹರ) 2012
Bhava Enage Hingitu (ಭವ ಎನಗೆ ಹಿಂಗಿತು) 2017

Novels
 Karma (ಕರ್ಮ) 2014
 Nunni (ನನ್ನಿ) 2015
 Grastha (ಗ್ರಸ್ತ) 2017
 Rayakonda (ರಾಯಕೊಂಡ) 2020
 Sattu (ಸತ್ತು) 2022

Translations
Karma (English) 2015

Seminar Paper
 'Parva'da Krishna : Rajatantra mattu Rajakarana (ಪರ್ವದ ಕೃಷ್ಣ : ರಾಜತಂತ್ರ ಮತ್ತು ರಾಜಕಾರಣ) 
 Hosa Odugana Jagattu (ಹೊಸ ಓದುಗನ ಜಗತ್ತು)

References

Year of birth missing (living people)
Living people
Kannada-language writers
Indian male novelists
21st-century Indian dramatists and playwrights
Bangalore University alumni
Kannada dramatists and playwrights
Writers from Bangalore
Indian male dramatists and playwrights
21st-century Indian novelists
21st-century Indian male writers
Novelists from Karnataka
Dramatists and playwrights from Karnataka